Costers del Segre is a Spanish Denominación de Origen Protegida (DOP) (Denominació d'Origen Protegida in Catalan) for wines located in the province of Lleida (Catalonia, Spain) and is divided into several separate sub-zones. The four original subzones created in 1988 are Artesa, to the northeast of Lleida, Valls de Riucorb to the east, Garrigues and Raïmat. In 1998 two other subzones were added: Pallars Jussà, next to the town of Tremp, 90 km north of Lleida and Segrià to the west and surrounded by the Raimat subzone.

Climate
The climate is continental (hot summers and cold winters), influenced by the proximity of the Pyrenees, though rainfall is sparse. Average rainfall is around 450 mm though 300 mm is common in the west. Average annual temperature is 15°C (max 35°C in summer, minimum below zero in winter). There are also extreme variations between daytime and night-time temperatures all year. Drought, hailstones and spring frosts are occasional risks for the vineyards.

Soils
Even though the vineyards are dispersed geographically, most are on dark lime bearing soils, with a high lime content, low clay content and poor in organic matter. Height varies between 250 m and 700 m above sea level.

Authorised Grape Varieties
The authorised grape varieties are:

 Red: Garnatxa Negra, Ull de llebre, Trepat, Cabernet Sauvignon, Merlot, Monastrell / Garrut, Sumoll, Syrah, Mazuela / Samsó, Pinot Noir, Cabernet Franc, Garnatxa Tintorera, Petit Verdot, and Malbec

 White: Macabeu, Xarel·lo, Parellada, Chardonnay, Garnatxa Blanca, Riesling, Sauvignon Blanc, Moscatell d’Alexandria, Malvasia / Subirat Parent, Gewurztraminer, Albarinho, Chenin, Viognier, Verdejo, and Godello

The older vines grow as low bushes (en vaso), while the more recently planted ones are on trellises (en espaldera) so as to allow mechanisation of vineyards activities. Maximum authorised planting density is 2,500 vines/ha. The vineyards in the west of the province use irrigation systems to mitigate the effects of the cold and the heat.

See also
Catalan wine

References

External links
 D.O.P. Costers del Segre official website

Wine regions of Spain
Catalan wine
Lleida